The Mandela Effect is a 2019 science fiction horror film written and directed by David Guy Levy, starring Charlie Hofheimer as a father grieving for the loss of his daughter. The character becomes obsessed with facts and events that many people remember incorrectly. Aleksa Palladino plays his also-grieving wife, while Robin Lord Taylor plays his best friend and brother-in-law, and Clarke Peters plays a washed-up scientist.

The Mandela Effect premiered at the Other Worlds Film Festival in October 2019, and was released in the United States in December, by Gravitas Ventures.

Plot 
Computer game designer Brendan (Charlie Hofheimer) and his wife, Claire (Aleksa Palladino), are grieving for their daughter Sam (Madeleine McGraw), who drowned trying to retrieve her Curious George doll from the ocean. As they reluctantly rummage through Sam's belongings, Brendan finds a copy of The Berenstain Bears. To the bewilderment of Brendan and his brother-in-law Matt (Robin Lord Taylor), they remember the title with "Berenstein," even though they find no evidence that it was ever changed. This leads them to learn about many other examples of the "Mandela Effect," collectively shared "false" memories. Brendan and Claire discover further discrepancies, such as clearly remembering that Sam's doll had a tail when it actually does not.

Eventually, Brendan concludes that the discrepancies are due to shifts between parallel universes and that Sam is still alive in one of them. Despite objections from Claire and Matt, he tracks down Dr. Roland Fuchs (Clarke Peters), a scientist who has been alienated for holding similar beliefs. Dr. Fuchs's research indicates that the universe is a computer simulation, with the Mandela Effect being the result of reality being rewritten to prevent its inhabitants from exposing it as a simulation. They begin developing a special computer program that, when run on the quantum computer of Dr. Fuchs' old campus, could interrupt the simulation.

This revelation takes a toll on Brendan's daily life and marriage. He also begins to have visions of Sam, which at first no one else sees, until one day she is inexplicably alive and everyone can perceive her. Disconcerted, Brendan visits Dr. Fuchs, only to be informed that he died by suicide two months ago. Having talked to him mere hours before, Brendan acknowledges the alteration as the simulation's attempt to thwart their plan. He rushes to finish the program, breaks into the college campus and runs it on the quantum computer. Glitches manifest and destabilize reality, prompting Brendan to rush home. As the family hold each other tightly, the simulation crashes.

The simulation restarts, recreating the history of the universe. The family is shown at the beach again, with this time Brendan asking Sam to leave her Curious George doll —now without a tail— before going to the water. This saves Sam's life and allows the simulation to continue beyond the event that originally led to its discovery and crash.

Cast
 Charlie Hofheimer as Brendan
 Aleksa Palladino as Claire
 Robin Lord Taylor as Matt
 Clarke Peters as Dr. Fuchs
 Madeleine Grace McGraw as Sam
 Tim Ransom as Pastor Isaac
 Ptolemy Slocum as Dr. Manning
 Vernee Watson as Nadine
 Elena Campbell-Martinez as Ms. Garcia
 Steven Daniel Brun as Adam
 Salme Geransar as Nasim Terhani

Release
The Mandela Effect premiered at the Other Worlds Film Festival on October 23, 2019, and was released in the United Kingdom on December 6, 2019, by Gravitas Ventures.

The film was released in theaters, as well as on VOD, on December 6, 2019.

Reception

Box office
The Mandela Effect had a very limited release, primarily distributed through VOD.

Critical response
The film received generally negative reviews from critics.

Noah Murray wrote for The Los Angeles Times that "...for the most part this movie is a tightly constructed and sensitively rendered conversation-starter, comparing grief and loss to the sensation of faulty memories. It takes a strange and fascinating meme, and makes it personal."

Frank Scheck of The Hollywood Reporter wrote: "Infused with enough deadening scientific jargon to lull a graduate student to sleep, the film, which feels much longer than its brief 80-minute running time, never succeeds in effectively dramatizing its outlandish premise."

References

External links
 
 

2019 films
2019 science fiction films
American science fiction horror films
2010s English-language films
2010s American films